was a Japanese samurai of the Sengoku period, who first served the Imagawa clan. He was involved in the defense of Sunpu Castle, but had to retreat when Takeda Shingen attacked. He later served Tokugawa Ieyasu in his battle against the Takedas, defending Hōkizuka Castle and defeating Miura Uemonnosuke.

References

Samurai
1513 births
1587 deaths